Mediacorp has given Star Awards to hosts for their performances in variety, info-ed or infotainment programmes since its inception. Throughout the history of the Star Awards, there have been hosts who have received multiple Star Awards for Best Variety Show Host, Best Info-Ed Programme Host, or Best Programme Host.

, seven hosts have received two or more Star Awards in hosting categories. Quan Yi Fong leads the way with seven awards (two Best Variety Show Host awards, one Best Info-Ed Programme Host award and four Best Programme Host awards), while Sharon Au, Mark Lee and Kym Ng have won four Best Variety Show Host awards. Au was the first to receive four awards in 2003, followed by Lee in 2012, then Ng in 2013, and most recently Quan in 2017. Quan was also the first to receive five, six, seven, and eight awards in 2018, 2019, 2021, and 2022 respectively.

References

External links

Lists of television people
Star Awards